= Yalebail =

- Village
- Interactive map of Yalebail
- Coordinates: 15°50′N 74°22′E
- Country: India
- State: Karnataka
- District: Belgaum
- Talukas: Belgaum

Languages
  - Official: [Marathi],[Kannada]]
- Time zone: UTC+5:30 (IST)

Yalebail is a village in Belgaum district in the southern state of Karnataka, India.
